Mutiara Damansara is an affluent major township in the northern flank of Petaling Jaya, Selangor, Malaysia.

Transportation

Public transportation
 Mutiara Damansara MRT station is the main railway station serving the township. rapidKL bus route 802 connects Mutiara Damansara to  Kelana Jaya LRT station.

Car
LDP  is the main road serving this township. There is a shortcut to Segambut via the SPRINT network's Penchala Link .

Gallery

See also 
Mutiara Rini

Towns in Selangor